The Crossett Methodist Church is now known as the First Methodist Church of Crossett.  It is at 500 Main St., Crossett, Arkansas, United States, and was built in 1949.

History
It is the work of architect John Parks Almand and of Trapp, Clippord & Phelps. It was listed on the National Register of Historic Places on February 17, 2010.

Before 1902, a travelling Methodist minister held meetings in a tent, across from the Missouri Pacific Railroad station. The owners of Crossett Lumber Company owned all the property in town and paid the preacher. The Arkansas law in 1837 prohibited the sale of liquor within one mile of a place of worship. Overnight, a wooden church was built on the site of the tent meeting. This kept a pending saloon license from being issued, and stopped its opening in the town.

See also
National Register of Historic Places listings in Ashley County, Arkansas

References

Churches on the National Register of Historic Places in Arkansas
Tudor Revival architecture in Arkansas
Gothic Revival church buildings in Arkansas
Churches completed in 1949
Churches in Ashley County, Arkansas
Methodist churches in Arkansas
National Register of Historic Places in Ashley County, Arkansas
1949 establishments in Arkansas